Coyote and Bronca (Spanish: El Coyote y la Bronca) is a 1980 Mexican adventure film directed by Rafael Villaseñor Kuri and starring Vicente Fernández, Blanca Guerra, Felipe Arriaga and Gloria Marín.

Cast 
 Vicente Fernández as Juan Mireles / El Coyote
 Blanca Guerra as María Trinidad / La Bronca
 Gloria Marín as Señora Marcia
 Angélica Vale as Amalia, niña
 Felipe Arriaga as El Cotija
 Estela Piquer as Amalia
 Carlos Derbez as Perseguidor
 Polo Ortín as Gerente hotel
 Freddy Fernández as Hijo de anciana
 Emma Roldán as Anciana enferma
 Carlos León as Perseguidor
 Mario Saavedra as Joven mojado
 Jennifer De Mello
 Queta Carrasco as Doña Leobarda, viejita chismosa
 José Nájera as Don Norberto
 Guillermo Lagunes
 Guillermo Álvarez Bianchi as Sacerdote
 Paco Sañudo as Empleado prostíbulo
 Regino Herrera as Abuelo
 Oscar Traven as Esbirro de Norberto
 Jorge Reynoso as Mojado
 Armando Martín as Juan, hijo del Coyote
 Elizabeth Aguilar as Prostituta
 Federico Falcón
 Diana Ferreti as Prostituta
 Inés Murillo as Nicanora, sirvienta
 José L. Murillo as Valerio
 María Prado as Mujer del Cotija
 Ángela Rodríguez as Mujer en iglesia

References

Bibliography 
 Ramírez Berg, Charles. Cinema of Solitude: A Critical Study of Mexican Film, 1967-1983. University of Texas Press, 2010.

External links 
 

1980 films
1980s adventure films
Mexican adventure films
1980s Spanish-language films
1980s Mexican films